Daniela Casanova (born 14 May 1984) is a former tennis player from Switzerland.

She achieved career-high WTA rankings of 456 in singles on 8 July 2002 and 402 in doubles on 17 June 2002. She won two singles titles and four doubles titles on the ITF Women's Circuit.

Playing for Switzerland in Fed Cup, Casanova has a win-loss record of 0–2. She retired from tennis in 2003.

Personal life
Casanova was born in Altstätten. She started playing tennis at the age of five. She was coached by her father, Leo Casanova, and Zoltan Kuharszky, and received advice from Melanie Molitor. She preferred hard courts and any fast surface. Her mother's name is Luzia. She has a brother, Sandro, and a younger sister, Myriam, who also has been a professional player.

ITF finals

Singles: 5 (2–3)

Doubles: 6 (4–2)

Fed Cup participation

Singles

Doubles

External links
 
 
 

1984 births
Living people
Swiss female tennis players
People from Altstätten
Sportspeople from the canton of St. Gallen